Hepsin is an enzyme. This enzyme catalyses the following chemical reaction

 Cleavage after basic amino-acid residues, with Arg strongly preferred to Lys

This type-II membrane-associated serine peptidase plays a role in cell growth and development.

See also 
 HPN (gene)

References

External links 
 

EC 3.4.21